Andrés Manzanares (born 26 November 1984) was an Argentine footballer. He played as defender.

References
 
 

1984 births
Living people
Sportspeople from Bariloche
Argentine people of Spanish descent
Argentine footballers
Argentine expatriate footballers
Club Atlético Temperley footballers
CSyD Tristán Suárez footballers
Quilmes Atlético Club footballers
Ñublense footballers
Crucero del Norte footballers
Chilean Primera División players
Argentine Primera División players
Expatriate footballers in Chile
Association football defenders